Debra W. Soh is a Canadian columnist, author, and former academic sex researcher.

Education and research 
Soh holds a Ph.D. degree in neuroscience from York University in Toronto. Her dissertation was titled Functional and Structural Neuroimaging of Paraphilic Hypersexuality in Men, and her committee included Keith Schneider of York University and James Cantor of the Centre for Addiction and Mental Health. During her graduate studies, Soh received the Michael Smith Foreign Research Award from the Social Sciences and Humanities Research Council of Canada and York's Provost Dissertation Scholarship.

While at York, she studied paraphilias. Her research indicates that these are neurological conditions rather than learned behaviours. A 2016 Cosmopolitan article highlighted some of Soh's findings and their implications for determining which men are likely to commit rape. A 2015 article she wrote for Salon.com spoke of how she studied a pedophile named Jacob who had come to her office after being arrested for luring what he thought was a 10-year-old minor but was actually an undercover police officer, recommended Germany’s Prevention Project Dunkelfeld as a solution, and gave sympathy to Todd Nickerson, who wrote two articles for the same magazine about his experiences as a non-offending pedophile, stating "The backlash that Todd Nickerson faced upon publicly writing about his personal struggle with pedophilia is a reminder that we, as a society, have far to go in challenging the way we think about this emotionally charged subject. But our current approach is not working."

Career
Soh has written articles for Quillette, The Globe and Mail, New York magazine, Playboy, Los Angeles Times, and The Wall Street Journal. She began hosting Quillette's Wrongspeak podcast with Jonathan Kay in May 2018. Soh describes herself as a former feminist who later became disillusioned with the term.

In a 2015 editorial, Soh criticized the prevalence of childhood gender transitions, advising parents and doctors to wait "until a child has reached cognitive maturity." Soh's essay, which referenced gender non-conforming aspects of her own childhood, argued that "a social transition back to one's original gender role can be an emotionally difficult experience." David A. French characterized this as "an understatement." Soh has also written against anti-conversion therapy laws that include both sexual orientation and gender identity, believing that such laws conflate the two and prevent legitimate therapeutic counselling for individuals with gender dysphoria. Fellow Canadian academics Florence Ashley and Alexandre Baril disputed Soh's interpretation of these studies. Psychologists Kristina Olson and Lily Durwood called Soh's research "alarmist".

Soh opposed the 2015 decision to close Toronto's gender identity clinic, which was known for beginning treatment after or during puberty in most cases. A previous inquiry had put the clinic's chief physician, Kenneth Zucker, at odds with other gender dysphoria specialists who provide support for patients who have not yet gone through puberty. Psychiatrist Jack Turban criticized Soh, stating that hormones are prescribed during puberty according to the Endocrine Society guidelines, adding that "As Soh notes in her article, gender identity is fixed at this time." The following year, Soh wrote an editorial which criticized CBC News for cancelling its airing of a British documentary that featured Zucker.

In 2016, Soh spent a weekend documenting the furry fandom in order to dispel myths about the subculture being primarily sexual in nature. The following year she publicly defended Jame Damore's "Google's Ideological Echo Chamber" letter, popularly referred to as the Google memo.

In 2018, Soh was described as a member of the "intellectual dark web" by New York Times opinion editor Bari Weiss.

Soh left Wrongspeak at the end of 2018.

In April 2019, Soh supported a lawsuit by Nova Scotia resident Lorne Grabher against the Registrar of Motor Vehicles. The suit was filed to reinstate a license plate bearing Grabher's last name whose similarity to the phrase "grab her" had made it the subject of a complaint. Soh testified that the plate would not encourage any socially adjusted person to commit a violent act and opined that the government was "overreaching."

On 4 August 2020, Soh published her first book, The End of Gender: Debunking the Myths about Sex and Identity in Our Society.

In 2021, Soh started her own podcast, "The Dr. Debra Soh Podcast".

Personal life
Soh is of Malaysian-Chinese descent.

References

External links
 

Living people
York University alumni
Canadian women scientists
Canadian women non-fiction writers
Science journalists
Canadian political journalists
Year of birth missing (living people)
Canadian people of Chinese descent
Canadian people of Malaysian descent
Canadian social commentators
Toronto Metropolitan University alumni
Canadian women podcasters